The Java razorfish (Xyrichtys javanicus) is a doubtful species of wrasse about which little is known.  This fish gets the name "javanicus" from Java, Indonesia, from which the type specimen was supposedly obtained. Also, some fish have been reported to have been spotted in the Red Sea.  The validity of this species is questioned pending further studies.

References

Java razorfish
Fish of Indonesia
Labridae
Fish described in 1862
Taxobox binomials not recognized by IUCN